Amma Enge is a 1964 Indian Tamil-language film directed by G. Viswanathan. The film stars Muthuraman, R. S. Manohar, Chandrakantha and Rajasri. It was released on 27 November 1964.

Plot 
Ranjitham is accused of stealing a diamond ring and is run out of town with her father. Her father dies heartbroken. Ranjitham joins a family as a nanny for a young girl, Amutha. The girl's mother has left her family with whereabouts unknown. The girl's father falls in love with Ranjitham and desires to marry her. He clears her name as a thief. Ring is found and is given as a gift to Ranjitham.

The young girl Amutha runs away and is later found safe in a forest by her father and Ranjitham.

Ranjitham agrees to marry Amutha's father who then goes to Madras to prepare for the wedding. Ranjitham goes to temple with the girl's aunt and is secretly followed by Amutha. Aunt locks off Ranjitham in the temple and asks her goons to kill Amutha. It is revealed aunt had killed Amutha's mother so her daughter could marry girl's father. Father is back home at the right time and rescues Amutha and later Ranjitham from the temple. Aunt runs away and commits suicide. Ranjitham gets married and sees off Amutha to school.

Cast 
The list is adapted from the book Thiraikalanjiyam

Male
R. S. Manohar
Muthuraman
Veerappan
Vairam Krishnamoorthy
Pazhaniyappan
Ali

Female
Chandrakantha
Rajasree
Baby Shakeela
Madhavi
B. V. Radha
Saraswathi

Production 
The film was produced by T. R. Sundaram under the banner Modern Theatres and was directed by G. Viswanathan. Screenplay and dialogues were written by A. L. Narayanan and Seehampatti Rajagopal. H. M. Venu was the director of Cinematography.

Soundtrack 
The music was composed by Vedha and the lyrics were penned by Kannadasan, Panchu Arunachalam, Vaali and Nallathambi.

Reception 
Writing for Kalki, S. Neelakantan said viewers needed three things before watching the film: patience, a liniment for headaches, and a pillow.

References

External links 
 

1960s Tamil-language films
Films scored by Vedha (composer)